The Melrose and Sinkola Plantations, in Thomas County, Georgia, a property of , was listed on the National Register of Historic Places in 1990.

The listed area included 50 contributing buildings, three contributing structures, and one contributing site.

A work by architects Walker & Weeks is included.

References

Houses on the National Register of Historic Places in Georgia (U.S. state)
Greek Revival architecture in Georgia (U.S. state)
Colonial Revival architecture in Georgia (U.S. state)
Houses in Thomas County, Georgia
National Register of Historic Places in Thomas County, Georgia
Plantations in Georgia (U.S. state)